The National Women's Under-18 Championship is a Canadian women's ice hockey tournament held by Hockey Canada for provincial and regional teams organized by its member branches. It is one of two national championships for female minor hockey in Canada, the other being the Esso Cup, which is a competition for midget 'AAA' clubs.

History
During its early years, the tournament was known as the Women's Under-18 Hockey Challenge and was not an annual event. The inaugural tournament was held in February 2001 in Trois-Rivières, Quebec. It was a six team tournament that featured regional teams: West (Manitoba/Saskatchewan), Quebec, Atlantic, Pacific (British Columbia/Alberta), and split squads from Ontario (Red and Blue). The second Under-18 Challenge took place in January 2005 at Salmon Arm, British Columbia.  This time the four western provinces entered separate teams, but the Atlantic provinces remained together.

In 2005, Hockey Canada restructured the Under-18 Challenge, moving to November and renaming it the National Women's Under-18 Championship. The first was held in November 2005, the same calendar year as the previous tournament. Both 2005 championships were won by the Ontario Red team.

The tournament is now held each year in November, but is skipped every fourth season when the women's hockey competition at the Canada Winter Games takes its place. Ontario teams have won every gold medal at this event.  Notable alumni of this tournament are Canadian national team veterans Meghan Agosta, Gillian Apps, and Sarah Vaillancourt.

Results

Notes
1. The 2004-05 and 2005-06 tournaments were held in the same calendar year as a result of Hockey Canada rescheduling the event from February to November.

Most Valuable Player

See also
 Esso Cup

External links
 National Women's U-18 Championship Website
 Hockey Canada National Women's U-18 Championship Guide and Record Book

References

Hockey Canada
Ice hockey tournaments in Canada
Women's ice hockey competitions in Canada
Youth ice hockey in Canada